Valon Fazliu (born 2 February 1996) is a Swiss professional footballer who plays as an attacking midfielder for Aarau.

Professional career
A youth product of the Grasshopper youth academy, Fazliu signed his first professional contract on 9 August 2017 for 3 years. Fazliu made his professional debut for Grasshopper in a 1-0 Swiss Super League loss to FC Sion on 19 February 2018.

In his debut season, Fazliu was loaned to Rapperswil-Jona and scored 7 goals in 23 games. On 21 July 2018, he signed with FC Lugano keeping him at the club until 2022. On 3 September 2019, he then joined FC Wil on a contract until June 2020 with an option for a further year.

On 10 June 2022, Fazliu signed a two-year contract with Aarau.

Personal life
Born in Switzerland, Fazliu is of Kosovo Albanian descent.

References

External links
 
 SFL Profile

1996 births
People from Dielsdorf District
Sportspeople from the canton of Zürich
Living people
Swiss men's footballers
Swiss people of Kosovan descent
Swiss people of Serbian descent
Serbian people of Kosovan descent
FC Rapperswil-Jona players
FC Lugano players
Grasshopper Club Zürich players
FC Wil players
FC Aarau players
Swiss Super League players
Swiss Challenge League players
Association football midfielders